The Tour of Antalya is a multi-day road cycling race held annually in Turkey. It is part of UCI Europe Tour in category 2.1. The first two editions were however only in category 2.2, before upgrading in 2020..

Winners

References

Cycle races in Turkey
2018 establishments in Turkey
Recurring sporting events established in 2018
UCI Europe Tour races